Windsor Park is a south central neighbourhood in the City of Edmonton, Alberta, Canada. It is located immediately to the west of the University of Alberta north campus and overlooking the North Saskatchewan River valley to the north, west, and south west.  It shares a short boundary with the neighbourhood of Belgravia to the south.

One of the benefits to residents comes from the neighbourhood's central location with easy access to other parts of the city provided by roads and by LRT stations located on the University of Alberta campus.

Groat Road leads into the river valley and to Hawrelak Park and Emily Murphy Park, both located in the river valley immediately below the neighbourhood. Groat Road and Groat Bridge give residents access to destinations on the north side, including downtown Edmonton, Westmount Centre, and Telus World of Science.

University Avenue and 87 Avenue both take residents to Whyte Avenue, and Old Strathcona.

The main artery south from the university area, 114 Street, gives access to Southgate Centre and Whitemud Drive. Whitemud Drive gives residents another way to reach the north side, with this one providing good access to West Edmonton Mall.

The University and Health Sciences LRT Stations, both located on the adjoining university campus, give residents another option for getting to the downtown core, as well as access to destinations in northeast Edmonton, including Northlands, the Coliseum, and Commonwealth Stadium.

Residents live near the Northern Alberta Jubilee Auditorium and the medical facilities provided through the University of Alberta Hospitals.

The community is represented by the Windsor Park Community League, established in 1947, which maintains a community hall and outdoor rink located at 118 Street and 87 Avenue.

Demographics 

See also 
 Edmonton Federation of Community Leagues

References

External links 
 Windsor Park Elementary School
 Windsor Park statistics from the 2009 City of Edmonton municipal census

Surrounding neighbourhoods 

Neighbourhoods in Edmonton